The canton of Gâtinais en Bourgogne is an administrative division of the Yonne department, central France. It was created at the French canton reorganisation which came into effect in March 2015. Its seat is in Saint-Valérien.

It consists of the following communes:
 
La Belliole
Brannay
Chéroy
Collemiers
Cornant
Courtoin
Dollot
Domats
Égriselles-le-Bocage
Fouchères
Jouy
Lixy
Montacher-Villegardin
Nailly
Saint-Agnan
Saint-Valérien
Savigny-sur-Clairis
Subligny
Vallery
Vernoy
Villebougis
Villeneuve-la-Dondagre
Villeroy
Villethierry

References

Cantons of Yonne